A Star for Bram is an album released by Robyn Hitchcock in 2000, comprising outtakes from his then recent Jewels for Sophia. It was issued on Hitchcock's own Editions PAF! label. The cover art matches its partner album, but is printed in different colours.

Although nominally outtakes, several of the tracks which appear are as strong as those on Jewels for Sophia, and include a formal recording of "1974", previously only available as a live track.

"I Saw Nick Drake" has garnered the most attention, being a plaintive ballad about English guitar legend Nick Drake, whilst "Nietzsche's Way" references the group Spirit, and their classic "Nature's Way".  "Antwoman" references the Bob Marley song "Punky Reggae Party".

Track listing 

"Daisy Bomb"
"I Saw Nick Drake"
"Adoration of the City"
"1974"
"I Wish I Liked You"
"Nietzsche's Way"
"The Philosopher's Stone"
"The Green Boy"
"Judas Sings (Jesus & Me)"
"Antwoman (Dub)"
"I Used to Love You"
"The Underneath"

Sources
 

2000 albums
Robyn Hitchcock albums